Alexander Danilov (born November 10, 1969) is an Israeli pistol shooter competed for his country at the 2000 Sydney Games and 2004 Athens Games.

Athletic career
Danilov competed in both the free pistol and air pistol shooting events. He won silver at the 1995 European Championships in the 50-meter free pistol event. Competing for Russia, he was fifth at the World Cup in Munich in 1997.

He was disqualified and placed last in the 10-meter pistol event at the 2000 Olympic Games when his trigger was found to be underweight. He scored 574 points, which would not have been enough to reach the finals. In the 50-meter free pistol event he scored 556 points and placed 18th.

He finished third at the 2001 Atlanta World Cup and placed fourth in free pistol, and placed second in air pistol at a World Cup event in Finland the following year. He placed 10th overall at the 2003 European Championships and third at a World Cup event in Bangkok in 2004. Also that year, he won a Grand-Prix meet with 668.7 points, setting a new Israeli record. At the 2004 Olympics, Danilove placed 15th in the 50 meter free pistol and 20th in the 10 meter air pistol event.

Danilov's wife, Olga Danilova, is a short track speed skater who competed for Israel at the 2002 Winter Olympics.

References

External links
 

1969 births
Living people
Russian emigrants to Israel
Russian male sport shooters
Israeli male sport shooters
Olympic shooters of Russia
Olympic shooters of Israel
ISSF pistol shooters
Shooters at the 1996 Summer Olympics
Shooters at the 2000 Summer Olympics
Shooters at the 2004 Summer Olympics
Jewish sport shooters